The University of Passo Fundo (Portuguese: Universidade de Passo Fundo), also known as UPF, is a Brazilian private university. Founded in 1968, it is located in the city of Passo Fundo, in the state of Rio Grande do Sul. It has about 20,000 students as of 2016.

References

External links
 UPF Official Website

Universities and colleges in Rio Grande do Sul
Private universities and colleges in Brazil
Educational institutions established in 1968
1968 establishments in Brazil